Ridgway Historic District is a national historic district located at Ridgway in Elk County, Pennsylvania.  It includes 726 contributing buildings, one contributing structure, and two contributing objects.  It encompasses the historic central business district and surrounding residential neighborhoods.  The architecture varies from modest vernacular residences and commercial buildings to spacious and highly detailed homes and business blocks, and a diverse collection of government buildings, churches, and schools.  Located within the district is the Elk County Courthouse and its attached jail.

It was added to the National Register of Historic Places in 2003.

References

Historic districts on the National Register of Historic Places in Pennsylvania
Geography of Elk County, Pennsylvania
National Register of Historic Places in Elk County, Pennsylvania